The lesser sciatic foramen is an opening (foramen) between the pelvis and the back of the thigh. The foramen is formed by the sacrotuberous ligament which runs between the sacrum and the ischial tuberosity and the sacrospinous ligament which runs between the sacrum and the ischial spine.

Structure
The lesser sciatic foramen has the following boundaries:
 Anterior: the tuberosity of the ischium
 Superior: the spine of the ischium and sacrospinous ligament
 Posterior: the sacrotuberous ligament

Alternatively, the foramen can be defined by the boundaries of the lesser sciatic notch and the two ligaments.

Function

The following pass through the foramen:
 the tendon of the obturator internus
 internal pudendal vessels
 pudendal nerve
 nerve to the obturator internus

See also
Greater sciatic foramen

References

External links

Bones of the pelvis